Juan Silva may refer to:

 Juan Silva (athlete) (1930–2007), Chilean long-distance runner
 Juan Silva (footballer, born 1948), Uruguayan footballer for Peñarol
 Juan Manuel Silva (born 1972), Argentine racing driver
 Juan Carlos Silva (born 1988), Mexican football midfielder
 Juan Silva (footballer, born January 1989), Uruguayan footballer for Juventud de Las Piedras
 Juan Silva (footballer, born March 1989), Chilean footballer for Deportes La Serena
 Juan Silva (footballer, born 1990), Chilean footballer for Deportes Melipilla
 Juan Silva (footballer, born 1997), Argentine footballer for Club de Gimnasia y Esgrima La Plata

See also
 Juan de Silva (died 1616), Spanish military commander and governor of the Philippines